The Y.W.C.A. Hioe Tjo Yoeng College is a government, English medium instruction (EMI), a grammar school in Kowloon City District (6 Sheung Wo Street, Ho Man Tin,  Kong). Established in 1971, HTYC is run under the sponsorship Christian Association and was founded with a donation from Mr. Hioe Tjo Yoeng.

See also
 Education in Hong Kong
 List of schools in Hong Kong

Protestant secondary schools in Hong Kong
Grammar schools
Secondary schools in Ho Man Tin
YWCA